Zuzana Marková may refer to:
 Zuzana Marková (swimmer)
 Zuzana Marková (soprano)